George Harold Marshall (3 March 1896–unknown) was an English footballer who played in the Football League for Bournemouth & Boscombe Athletic, Walsall and Wolverhampton Wanderers. At Wolves, Marshall played in the 1921 FA Cup Final where they lost to Tottenham Hotspur.

References

1896 births
English footballers
Association football forwards
English Football League players
Shankhouse F.C. players
Southend United F.C. players
Wolverhampton Wanderers F.C. players
Walsall F.C. players
Reading F.C. players
AFC Bournemouth players
Darlaston F.C. players
FA Cup Final players
Year of death missing